The 2001 Grand Prix Hassan II was a men's tennis tournament played on outdoor clay courts at the Complexe Al Amal in Casablanca, Morocco that was part of the International Series of the 2001 ATP Tour. It was the 17th edition of the tournament and was held from 9 April until 15 April 2001. Guillermo Cañas, who entered the main draw as a qualifier, won the singles title.

Finals

Singles

 Guillermo Cañas defeated  Tommy Robredo 7–5, 6–2
 It was Cañas's 1st title of the year and the 2nd of his career.

Doubles

 Michael Hill /  Jeff Tarango defeated  Pablo Albano /  David Macpherson 7–6(7–2), 6–3
 It was Hill's only title of the year and the 2nd of his career. It was Tarango's only title of the year and the 16th of his career.

External links
 Official website 
 ATP tournament profile

 
Grand Prix Hassan II
Grand Prix Hassan II
Grand Prix Hassan II
Grand Prix Hassan II